Mohsen Ab Rural District is a rural district (dehestan) in the Central District of Mehran County, Ilam Province, Iran. At the 2006 census, its population was 6,901, in 1,485 families.  The rural district has 11 villages.

References 

Rural Districts of Ilam Province
Mehran County